Patricia Mary Worth  (born 21 April 1946), Australian politician, is a former Liberal member of the Australian House of Representatives from March 1993 to October 2004, representing the Division of Adelaide, South Australia. She was born in Riverton, South Australia, and was a registered nurse and midwife and a manager in health administration before entering politics.

Worth was Parliamentary Secretary to the Minister for Health and Family Services 1997–98 and Parliamentary Secretary to the Minister for Education, Training and Youth Affairs 1998–2001, and Parliamentary Secretary to the Minister for Health and Aging from November 2001 to October 2004.

Worth was defeated for reelection in 2004 by Labor's Kate Ellis even as the Liberals were easily re-elected to a fourth term in government.  After leaving Parliament, Worth became the chairwoman of DrinkWise Australia

In 2016, Worth was awarded as a Member of the Order of Australia (AM).

References

1946 births
Living people
Liberal Party of Australia members of the Parliament of Australia
Members of the Australian House of Representatives for Adelaide
Members of the Australian House of Representatives
Women members of the Australian House of Representatives
Australian nurses
Australian midwives
Members of the Order of Australia
People from Riverton, South Australia
Australian women nurses
21st-century Australian politicians
21st-century Australian women politicians
20th-century Australian politicians
20th-century Australian women politicians